Salair Ridge (pronounced sah-lah-EER) is an eroded plateau-type highland in the Southwestern Siberia, Russia, particularly in Altai Krai, Kemerovo and Novosibirsk Oblast. It is a natural continuation of Altai Mountains and separates the Kuznetsk Depression from the Ob River Plain to the southwest. Its main ridge is nearly parallel to that of Kuznetsk Alatau. The ridge is some 300 kilometres in length and 15-40 kilometres wide.

The mountains are rich in complex ores. The highest peak is Kivda, at 621 meters.

Major rivers include the Berd' (see the city of Berdsk), Suenga River and Chumysh River.

See also
Geography of South-Central Siberia
South Siberian Mountains

External links
Salair Ridge
A map of paleolithic settlements at Salair Ridge

Mountain ranges of Russia
Landforms of Kemerovo Oblast
Landforms of Novosibirsk Oblast
Altai Mountains
South Siberian Mountains